Manuel Alejandro Salazar Rivas (born January 23, 1986 in San Salvador) is a retired Salvadoran professional footballer.

He represented the El Salvador.

Club career
Salazar started his career at Salvadoran Second Division side Telecom before joining Luís Ángel Firpo in 2005.

In December 2008, Salazar along with his club and national team teammate Carlos Monteagudo, both were invited to train with Mexican Primera División A team Monterrey 1a. A (effectively CF Monterreys reserve team), with the hopes of signing with the club's second division side. After the two-week trial, both players returned to El Salvador, with the promise from head coach Gerardo Jiménez, that he would look to open negotiations to transfer them to the club, whether on a full-time basis, or on loan however neither player was ever signed. On July 1, 2010, Salazar signed a six-month contract with FAS only to rejoin Firpo for the 2011 Clausura claiming FAS owing him three months wages.

International career
Salazar received his first call up to the national team in January 2007 and made his debut for El Salvador in a February 2007 UNCAF Nations Cup match against Nicaragua. He earned a total of 50 caps, scoring no goals, and has represented his country in 18 FIFA World Cup qualification matches. He has played at the 2007 UNCAF Nations Cup, as well as at the 2007 and 2009 CONCACAF Gold Cups.

His final international game was an October 2010 friendly match against Costa Rica.

Retirement from football
On May 18, 2011, Salazar decided to retire from the sport due to long-standing knee problems and to focus on his academic and business ventures (he owns a restaurant).

References

External links
 

1986 births
Living people
Sportspeople from San Salvador
Association football defenders
Salvadoran footballers
El Salvador international footballers
2007 UNCAF Nations Cup players
2007 CONCACAF Gold Cup players
2009 CONCACAF Gold Cup players
C.D. Luis Ángel Firpo footballers
C.D. FAS footballers